Hagai Dikan was an Israeli diplomat who was Israel’s first ambassador to Singapore.

He has also served as ambassador to Costa Rica, Uruguay, the Ivory Coast, Venezuela, and Burkina Faso.

References

Ambassadors of Israel to Singapore
Ambassadors of Israel to Costa Rica
Ambassadors of Israel to Uruguay
Ambassadors of Israel to Ivory Coast
Ambassadors of Israel to Venezuela
Ambassadors of Israel to Burkina Faso